Operation Bootstrap is the name given to a series of projects which transformed the economy of Puerto Rico into an industrial and developed one. The federal government of the United States together with what is known today as the Puerto Rico Industrial Development Company set forth a series of ambitious economical projects that evolved Puerto Rico into an industrial high-income territory. Bootstrap is still considered the economic model of Puerto Rico as the island has still not been able to evolve into a knowledge economy.

History
The island's traditional economy was based around sugarcane plantations; of the 516,730 jobs on the island in 1940, almost half of them were agriculture-based, with 124,076 of these based on sugar-cane farms. However, Esteban Bird described in detail the misgivings of the sugarcane industry and the monoculture economy in general. By the middle of the twentieth century it remained one of the poorest in the Caribbean. After possession of the island was transferred to the United States in 1898 after the Spanish-American War, it remained mostly neglected. Conditions in Puerto Rico worsened during the world wars, after years of neglect. Pressure grew in the U.S. to address the worsening situation, influenced by journalists like John Gunther who described the island in 1941 as such:

"I saw, in short, misery, disease, squalor, filth. It would be lamentable enough to see this anywhere...to see it on American territory...is a paralyzing jolt to anyone who believes in American standards of progress and civilization."

In May 1947, the Puerto Rican legislature passed the Industrial Incentives Act eliminating all corporate taxes, to encourage U.S. investment in industry. The initiative granted private and foreign investment a ten year period of exemption from taxes on many of the expenses for businesses involved in the industrial economy. These exemptions included:

 "license fees, excises, or other municipal taxes levied by any ordinance of any municipality,"
 "property devoted to industrial development,
 "income tax on income from industrial development," and more.

This was proposed by Senator Luis Muñoz Marín of the Popular Democratic Party, and became known as Operation Bootstrap.  Based on 1930s New Deal economic relief reforms and infrastructure provided by the programs such as the Puerto Rico Reconstruction Administration, Operation Bootstrap intended to move Puerto Rico away from its agrarian system and into an industrial economy. The government's Administration of Economic Development — today known as the Puerto Rico Industrial Development Company (PRIDCO) — encouraged the establishment of factories.  Following the Elective Governor Act of 1947 (also known as the Crawford-Butler Act), Marín was elected the first governor of Puerto Rico while under U.S. control, paving the way for the full establishment of Operation Bootstrap across the island.  According to Virginia Sanchez Korrol from the Center for Puerto Rican Studies, Operation Bootstrap was based on 3 essential elements:

“1) industrialization by invitation: the inducement of American corporations to relocate in Puerto Rico in exchange for lucrative tax benefits;

(2)  a cheap labor pool, educated in the English language and under a U.S. imposed curriculum;

(3) proposed emigration of over a third of the island’s population, a security measure to insure the plan’s viability.”

The US government in Puerto Rico enticed US companies by providing labor at costs below those on the mainland, access to US markets without import duties, and profits that could transfer to the mainland free from federal taxation. The Administration of Economic Development invited investment of external capital, importing the raw materials, and exporting the finished products to the mainland. To entice participation, tax exemptions and differential rental rates were offered for industrial facilities. As a result, Puerto Rico's economy shifted labor from agriculture to manufacturing and tourism. The manufacturing sector has shifted from the original labor-intensive industries, such as the manufacturing of food, tobacco, leather, and apparel products, to more capital-intensive industries, such as pharmaceuticals, chemicals, machinery, and electronics. Through this project, a rural agricultural society was transformed into an industrial working class.

Although initially touted as an economic miracle, by the 1960s, Operation Bootstrap was increasingly hampered by a growing unemployment problem. As living standards and wages in Puerto Rico rose, manpower-intensive industries faced competition from outside the United States. It also faced criticism from civil rights groups and the Catholic Church, who perceived the government promoting birth control, and engaging in non-consensual surgical sterilization. American industrialists influenced by eugenicists policies were concerned with "overpopulation" and a perceived lack of self-control on the part of the working class Puerto Ricans.

As of 2005 the continental United States remains Puerto Rico's major trading partner, received 86% of Puerto Rico's exports and providing 69% of its imports.

Effects

Increased Living Standards 
Those able to secure a stable job as a result of Operation Bootstrap received higher wages than before, in fact, " The average real weekly salary in manufacturing increased from $18 for men and $12 for women in 1953 to $44 and $37 respectively in 1963." The increase in industrialization and manufacturing saw positive effects in other places, as new electric grids were built, new roads were paved in major cities, and major housing development was underway. As a result, life expectancy in Puerto Rico jumped almost 23 years.

Shift in Job Market 

Manufacturing jobs also led to a shift in the job market as it pertains to gender. in 1940, women represented half of the total population of Puerto Rico, but represented less than 25% of the labor force. Women in Operation Bootstrap were targeted as an important labor force, especially for the garment and apparel industry, which represented a share of the manufacturing market.

Education 
At the time, modernization theory was the driving force behind American program development in the Cold War era. As a result, Operation Bootstrap focused on educational development to fuel economic development in Puerto Rico. In the 1950s, education was viewed as the cornerstone of Island development and was allocated more of the Islands budget than any other public sector. From 1932-1957 the number of students enrolled in vocational education went from 5,700 to 110,000. The rise in vocational education was designed to prepare Puerto Rican's for work in factories newly developed by the Bootstrap program.

Mass Migration 
Mass emigration from Puerto Rico was a result of Operation Bootstrap. The growth of the industrial sector could not match the rapid decline of monocultural plantation jobs that characterized the economy of Puerto Rico Pre-World War II. Also, while U.S. businesses sought Puerto Ricans for labor, these businesses were still very willing to continue to seek new, and even cheaper forms of labor. High volatility in employment for those on the island was a direct result. This led to mass unemployment across the island, with the countryside seeing the largest effect. Residents were forced to either move to bigger cities like San Juan or immigrate to the United States for better financial opportunities and higher wages. In the 1950s (the peak of Puerto Rican emigration from the island), as ~470,000 Puerto Ricans emigrated from their country, they went to cities like New York City (where 85% of which people settled), Philadelphia, and others along the East Coast. Through the 60's and 70's, emigration from Puerto Rico declined dramatically.

Coerced Sterilization 
Throughout the 1940s and to the 1960s, programs supported by the United States encouraged sterilization and birth control for the women on the island. These programs were birthed out of a perceived "overpopulation" problem on the island. Puerto Rican families averaged 5 to 6 people per family, and this was labeled as partly the reason for the unemployment and high poverty rates on the island. Luis Muños Marín was concerned that the perceived overpopulation problem could derail Operation Bootstrap, so his administration was in support. Across the island, the sterilization procedure was referred to as 'la operación." According to Antonia Darder, "By 1969, 35% of all Puerto Rican women of child-bearing age had undergone la operación."

See also
 United States Department of Agriculture
 Commonwealth Oil Refining Company
 Progress Island U.S.A.
 Puerto Rican Pottery

Further reading
 Teodoro Moscoso and Puerto Rico's Operation Bootstrap by A.W. Maldonado. Gainesville: University Press of Florida, 1997. 
 Las campañas de control de la natalidad contra las mujeres, by Gloria Arimón en Servir al pueblo, número 233, 1984.
 Economic History of Puerto Rico: Institutional Change and Capitalist Development, by James L. Dietz. Princeton, NJ: Princeton University Press, 1986.
 The Disenchanted Island: Puerto Rico and the United States in the Twentieth Century, by Ronald Fernández. 2ª ed. Westport CT: Praeger, 1996.
 Factories and Food Stamps: The Puerto Rico Model of Development, by Richard Weisskoff. Baltimore, MD: Johns Hopkins University Press, 1985.

Notes

References

External links
 Democracy at Work in Rural Puerto Rico (ca. 1940s)
 A Puerto Rican resource
 Young Lords in Lincoln Park

Economic history of Puerto Rico
Economy of Puerto Rico
Manufacturing in Puerto Rico